The 2015 AT&T American Cup is the 39th edition of the American Cup and the final event in the 2014-15 FIG World Cup series.

Participants

Women 
  Simone Biles
  Elsabeth Black
  Erika Fasana
  Vanessa Ferrari
  Claudia Fragapane
  Emily Little
  Jessica López
  Natsumi Sasada
  Mykayla Skinner

Results

Women

Men

References 

American Cup (gymnastics)
2015 FIG World Cup series
2015 in gymnastics
Sports competitions in Arlington, Texas
21st century in Arlington, Texas